El Talismán (The Talisman) is a telenovela co-produced by Venevision and Univision Studios, starring Blanca Soto and Rafael Novoa as the main protagonists, and Aarón Díaz, Lola Ponce, and Marcela Mar as the main antagonists. Univision had announced that El Talismán would air on the network as part of the 2011–2012 programming schedule, and was confirmed to air in 2012 on November 11, 2011. Though 120 episodes were planned to be produced, the episode count was reduced to a total of 98 due to low ratings.

From January 30 to February 3, 2012, Univision aired El Talismán at 8pm/7c, replacing one hour of Una familia con suerte, and later at 9pm/8c from February 6 to March 9, 2012. Though El Talismán was seen by 5 million viewers during its premiere day, viewership declined over time during its prime time airings. As a result, Univision aired El Talismán at 1pm central from March 12 to June 15, 2012.

Cast 
 Blanca Soto as Camila Nájera de Ibarra
 Rafael Novoa as Pedro Ibarra 
 Aarón Díaz as Antonio Negrete 
 Lola Ponce as Lucrecia Negrete 
 Marcela Mar as Doris de Negrete / Catherine
 Karyme Lozano as Mariana Aceves 
 Julieta Rosen as Elvira Rivera de Nájera 
 Roberto Vander as Esteban Nájera 
 Sergio Reynoso as Don Gregorio Negrete 
 Pablo Azar as José Armando Nájera
 Braulio Castillo as Renato Leduc 
 Roberto Huicochea as Valentin Ramos
 Paola Pedroza as Tracy Guadalupe Perez 
 Tatiana Rodríguez as Genoveva 
 German Barrios as Bernando Aceves 
 Rodrigo Vidal as Panchito Negrete
 Joaquin Gil as Margarito Flores 
 Gloria Mayo as Patricia "Paty" Aceves 
 Isabel Burr as Fabiola Negrete 
 Sandra Itzel as Florencia Negrete 
 Marianela Rodriguez as Rosa 
 Gustavo Pedraza as Tomas Guerrido 
 Glauber Barceló as Claudio Flores
 Lyduan González as Gabriel Barrasa 
 Michelle Vargas as Sarita 
 Yuli Ferreira as Rita Ledesma 
 Carlos Arrechea as Juancho 
 Gabriela Guevara as Suzy 
 Nadia Escobar as Alberta Sierra
 Manolo Coego Jr. as Raúl 
 Alma Delfina as Matilde Aceves 
 Carmen Daysi Rodríguez as Brigitte
 Gerardo Riverón as Guillermo
 Hilda Luna as Domitila 
 Juan Cepero as Jim Smith
 Victoria del Rosal as Lucy 
 Elioret Silva
 Severino Puente as Secretario
 Freddy Viquez as Lucas 
 Víctor Cámara as Manuel Bermúdez 
 Eva Tamargo as María Rivera 
 Adrián Carvajal as Ángel Espinoza 
 Christian Vega as Santiago

References

External links

 Official website

Spanish-language American telenovelas
2012 telenovelas
2012 American television series debuts
2012 American television series endings
2012 Mexican television series debuts
2012 Mexican television series endings
Venevisión telenovelas
Univision telenovelas
Television shows set in Tijuana
Television shows set in San Antonio
Television shows set in Los Angeles
Television shows set in Miami